Amar Bondhu Rashed (English: My Friend Rashed) is a film directed by Morshedul Islam, known for making indie movies. Adapted from the novel of same name Amar Bondhu Rashed by Muhammad Zafar Iqbal, the story narrates the brave and courageous actions displayed by schoolboy Rashed, told from the perspective of his friend Ibu, during the Bangladesh Liberation war and Bangladesh Genocide. The movie was released on 1 April 2011. The music was composed and directed by Rizvi Hasan.

It is considered as one of the most critically acclaimed films of Bangladesh.

Plot
This a story of a boy named Ibu during Bangladesh Liberation War in 1971. He lives in a small town. The main character Rashed suddenly appears at his school. Rashed, the name was given by the class teacher at the first day at school. In 1971, when other students are not conscious about the liberation movement Rashed could understand the matters. Rashed started to motivate others to make them understand those matters. One day, Pakistani army attacks the town and Rashed observes the battle. He and his friends start to help the Mukti Bahini.

Cast
 Chowdhury Zawata Afnan as Rashed
 Rayaan Ittesham Chowdhury as Ibu
Rizvi Hasan
 Refayat Zinnat as Fazlu
 Faiyaz Bin Zia as Asraf
 Shovon Jaman
 Likhon Rahi as Dilip
 Kaosar Abedin as Kader
 Arman Parvez Murad as Shafiq Bhai
 Humaira Himu  as Aru Apa
 Raisul Islam Asad as senior Ibu
 Kazi Rayhan Rabbi as Ibu's son
 Pijush Banerjee as Ibu's father
 Wahida Mollick Jolly as Ibu's mother
 Inamul Huque as Majid Sir
 Gazi Rakayet as Ajraf Ali
 Kamol Ghosh as Dilip's father
 Kholilur Rahman Kadery as doctor
 Md Jakir Hossain (Actor) as Freedom Fighters
 Habibur Rahman as Freedom Fighter
 Shahinur Rahman as Freedom Fighter

Production 
Amar Bondhu Rashed was based on the novel of the same name by professor Muhammad Zafar Iqbal and was adapted by Filmmaker Morshedul Islam. This is the second collaboration between Zafar Igbal and Morshedul Islam following Dipu Number 2. It was jointly produced by Monon Chalachitra and Impress Telefilm Ltd and was partially funded by a grant from the Government of Bangladesh. Ashirbad Chalachitra was the distributor of the film.

Release 
Amar Bondhu Rashed was released on 1 April 2011 in Dhaka, Khulna, Rajshahi, and Dinajpur in Bangladesh. The premier of the movie was held in Star Cineplex in Dhaka. The Pabna District Police and Pathshala, a non-profit organization, jointly organized the screening of the movie in 30 school and colleges in the district. The movie was screen at Shahjalal University of Science and Technology where the write of the book, Muhammad Zafar Iqbal, is a faculty member. On 23 May 2011, it was screen in Manikganj District. On 16 July 2011 the movie was screened at Rajshahi University. The movie was screened at the 7th annual South Asian Film Festival in 2012. It was screened at the  6th International Children's Film Festival, organized by Children's Film Society of Bangladesh, in Khulna in 2013. The movie was screened at a film festival organized by the Theatre and Film Department of Bangladesh Shilpakala Academy in 2013.

Reception 
Tamana Khan wrote in her review for The Daily Star wrote that it was  a "commendable effort to bring something entertaining for children but one that could have been done with a little more finesse". She praised the attempt but felt the adaption did not develop the relationship between the characters by leaving out some of the scenes from the book. The Daily Star placed it on a list of "essential Bangla movies for children" list in 2015 and on a list of 5 "memorable films" on the Bangladesh Liberation war in 2017.

See also 
 Dipu Number Two

References

External links
 

2011 films
2011 war drama films
Bengali-language Bangladeshi films
Bangladeshi war drama films
Bangladesh Liberation War
Bangladeshi teen films
Films based on Bangladeshi novels
Films set in 1971
Films set in Bangladesh
Bangladesh Liberation War fiction
Films scored by Emon Saha
2010s Bengali-language films
Films directed by Morshedul Islam
Films based on the Bangladesh Liberation War
2011 drama films
Impress Telefilm films